Isekai Quartet is a Japanese anime series that serves as a chibi-style crossover between the light novel series KonoSuba, Overlord, Re:Zero − Starting Life in Another World, and The Saga of Tanya the Evil, all published by Kadokawa Corporation. The series is written and directed by Minoru Ashina, with character designs by Minoru Takehara, who also serves as chief animation director. The series is animated by Studio Puyukai. It aired from April 9 to June 25, 2019. The series ran 12 episodes. Funimation has licensed the series and is streaming it in both Japanese and English. On April 23, 2019, it was added to Crunchyroll's streaming library as well. Satoshi Hino, Jun Fukushima, Yūsuke Kobayashi and Aoi Yūki perform the opening theme song , while Yumi Hara, Sora Amamiya, Rie Takahashi and Aoi Yūki perform the ending theme song .

A second season of the anime series was announced at the ending of Episode 12 and premiered on January 14, 2020. The main staff members returned to reprise their roles. The season includes guest appearances of characters from The Rising of the Shield Hero. Hino, Fukushima, Kobayashi and Yūki perform the second season's opening theme song , while Sumire Uesaka, Rie Takahashi, Inori Minase, and Saori Hayami perform the second season's ending theme song, . The second season ran for 12 episodes. Funimation has licensed the series for a simuldub. Crunchyroll is also streaming the second season. Muse Asia is streaming the second season in Southeast Asia.

A sequel to the anime series was announced at the ending of the second season's final episode.

Series overview

Episode list

Season 1 (2019)

Season 2 (2020)

Notes

References

External links

  
 
 

Isekai Quartet